General elections were held in Greenland on 22 November 2005. The result was a victory for Siumut, whose leader Hans Enoksen remained Prime Minister.

Results

References

Elections in Greenland
Greenland
Parliamentary election
November 2005 events in North America